Lump may refer to:

 "Lump" (song), a 1995 song by The Presidents of the United States of America
 Lump (compilation album), a 2000 best-of album by The Presidents of the United States of America
 Lump (dog), a dog who inspired Pablo Picasso
 The Lump, a 1991 animated short film
 Lump hammer, a sledgehammer
 Lump, a thermo-spatial unit in a lumped capacitance model of a thermal system
 Swelling (medical)
 Globus pharyngis, a "lump in one's throat"
 Clay lump, a mudbrick
 Lump of coal, a threat to misbehaving children (instead of presents at Christmas); or a bringer of warmth for the New Year
 Lump, the Ober of Hearts in Schafkopf language
 Protusion on a tool surface, also known as gall
 LUMP, a musical collaboration of Laura Marling and Tunng member Mike Lindsay
 The practice of combining sets of individuals into one classification

See also
 Lump sum, a one-time payment of money